Neil Aitken (born 1974 in Vancouver, British Columbia) is a Canadian poet, editor, and translator. He founded Boxcar Poetry Review. His first book, The Lost Country of Sight, won the 2007 Philip Levine Prize for Poetry.

Biography

Early life and education 
Aitken was born in Vancouver in 1974 and was raised in Saudi Arabia, Taiwan, Canada, and the United States. His father was of Scottish and English descent and his mother was of Chinese descent. He had a younger sister. He attended elementary and secondary school in Regina. Throughout high school, he enjoyed painting. As an undergraduate, he studied Computer Engineering with a minor in Mathematics.

He worked as a computer games programmer for several years. In 2004, he quit his position to study at the University of California, Riverside, where he earned an MFA. He earned a PhD in Literature & Creative Writing from the University of Southern California.

Literature career 
Aitken's first book, The Lost Country of Sight, won the 2007 Philip Levine Prize. In 2016, he published Babbage’s Dream, a semi-finalist for the Anthony Hecht Prize.  He founded Boxcar Poetry Review. Aitken and Chinese poet-translator Ming Di translated The Book of Cranes: Selected Poems of Zang Di. In 2011, Aitken was awarded the DJS Translation Prize for "his translations of contemporary Chinese poetry."

See also

Canadian literature
Canadian poetry
List of Canadian poets
List of Canadian writers

References 

1974 births
Living people
Canadian male poets
Canadian people of Chinese descent
Canadian people of Scottish descent
Canadian people of English descent
Writers from Vancouver
University of California, Riverside alumni
University of Southern California alumni
21st-century Canadian poets
21st-century Canadian male writers
Canadian male non-fiction writers
21st-century Canadian translators
Canadian writers of Asian descent